Statistics of the Scottish Professional Football League (SPFL) in season 2022–23.

Scottish Premiership

Scottish Championship

Scottish League One

Scottish League Two

Award winners

See also
2022–23 in Scottish football

References

 
Scottish Professional Football League seasons